Lojze Lebič (born 23 August 1934) is a Slovenian composer and conductor of choral and instrumental music.

Life 
Lebič was born August 23, 1934 in Prevalje, in the Carinthia region of Slovenia (then part of Yugoslavia). He attended the University of Ljubljana for a bachelor's degree in archaeology and the Academy of Music in Ljubljana, where he studied with composition with Marijan Kozina and conducting with Danilo Švara.

Music 
Lebič's early style was fairly traditional, but his work from after 1965 demonstrates the influence of the European avant-garde. The opening of Slovenia to foreign travel in the 1950s and 60s allowed for greater musical and cultural exchange with the rest of Yugoslavia and Europe, encouraging the development of a Slovenian avant garde. Lebič's 1965 works Meditacije za dva for viola and cello and the cantata Požgana trava are examples of his use of new melodic and vocal techniques.

Works 
 Per Archi (Za Golala) for string orchestra (2009)
 Invocation/ à Primož Ramovš (clarinet and piano), commissioned by the University of Wisconsin-Milwaukee Libraries 
 Meditacije za dva (Meditations for Two) for viola and cello (1965, revised 1972)
 Rubato per viola for viola solo (1989)
 Hvalnica svetu (In Praise of the World) for double choir, piano four-hands and percussion (1988)

Awards 
In 1967, he was awarded the Prešeren Award for conducting.

Further reading 
Barbo, Matjaz. “Music as a Language of Globalisation? The Metalinguistic Context of Lebic’s Music.” Muzikološki zbornik 43, no. 1 (2007): 187–192.
Lojze Lebič (1993) From generation to generation the spirit seeks the way: Slovene musical Creativity in the past and today, Nationalities Papers, 21:1, 145-155, DOI: 10.1080/00905999308408264
Pompe, Gregor. “Sacred Rituality and Mysticism in the Service of the Awakening of National Identity. Baltic-Balkan Parallels in the Works of B. Kutavicius, L. Lebic and V. Tormis.” Muzikološki zbornik 50, no. 2 (2014): 111–125.

References

1934 births
Living people
Slovenian composers
Slovenian conductors (music)
Prešeren Award laureates
Yugoslav composers